Michael Santiago (born July 28, 1989) is an American mixed martial artist who competed in the Featherweight division of the Ultimate Fighting Championship.

Mixed martial arts career

Early career
Starting his career in 2010, Mark compiled a 20–10 record fighting for a variety of American regional promotions, most notably winning the Ring of Combat Featherweight championship, which he defended twice, and both the Lightweight and Featherweight championships at Hoosier FC, before he was given a chance to earn a UFC contract at Dana White's Contender Series.

Mike fought Mark Cherico on August 22, 2017 at Dana White's Contender Series 7 . He won the fight via TKO in the first round but did not earn a UFC contract. However a week later, he got a chance as an injury replacement.

Ultimate Fighting Championship

Santiago made his UFC debut as an injury replacement for Nick Hein againstZabit Magomedsharipov on September 2, 2017 at UFC Fight Night: Struve vs. Volkov. Santiago lost the fight via submission rear-naked choke in the second round.

His second fight came on January 14, 2018 at UFC Fight Night: Stephens vs. Choi against Mads Burnell. He lost the fight via unanimous decision.

Mike faced Dan Ige  on June 9, 2018 at UFC 225. He lost the fight via TKO in the first round.

Championships and accomplishments

Mixed martial arts
Ring of Combat
ROC Featherweight Championship
Two successful defences
Hoosier FC
Hoosier FC Featherweight Championship
Hoosier FC Lightweight Championship

Mixed martial arts record

|-
|Loss
|align=center|22–15
| Bruno Machado
|Technical Submission (anaconda choke)
|UAE Warriors 12
|
|align=center|2
|align=center|2:11
|Abu Dhabi, United Arab Emirates
|
|-
|Loss
|align=center|22–14
| Timur Nagibin
| TKO (corner stoppage)
| Russian Cagefighting Championship: RCC Intro 6
| 
| align=center| 2
| align=center| 5:00
| Ekaterinburg, Russia
|
|-
|Win
|align=center|22–13
| Alonzo Martinez
|Submission (guillotine choke)
|Final Fight Championship 37
|
|align=center|2
|align=center|3:22
|Las Vegas, Nevada, United States
|
|-
|Loss
|align=center|21–13
| Dan Ige
|TKO (punches)
|UFC 225 
|
|align=center|1
|align=center|0:50
|Chicago, Illinois, United States
|
|-
|Loss
|align=center|21–12
| Mads Burnell
| Decision (unanimous)
| UFC Fight Night: Stephens vs. Choi
| 
| align=center| 3
| align=center| 5:00
| St. Louis, Missouri, United States
|
|-
|Loss
|align=center|21–11
| Zabit Magomedsharipov
|Submission (rear-naked choke)
|UFC Fight Night: Volkov vs. Struve
|
|align=center|2
|align=center|4:22
|Rotterdam, Netherlands
|
|-
|Win
|align=center|21–10
| Mark Cherico
| KO (punches)
| Dana White's Contender Series 7 
|
|align=center|1
|align=center|1:59
|Las Vegas, Nevada, United States
|
|-
|Win
|align=center| 20–10
|Nick Wayne
| TKO (punches)
| Hoosier Fight Club 33
|
|align=center|1
|align=center|2:07
|Hammond, Indiana, United States
|
|-
| Win
| align=center| 19–10
|  Bill Kamery
| Submission (armbar)
| Hoosier Fight Club 31
| 
| align=center| 1
| align=center| 2:34
| Hammond, Indiana, United States
|
|-
|Win
|align=center| 18–10
|Luis Saldaña
| TKO (punches)
| RFA 39
|
|align=center|3
|align=center|2:27
|Hammond, Indiana, United States
|
|-
| Win
| align=center| 17–10
|  Lester Caslow 
| Submission (guillotine choke)
| Ring of Combat 54
| 
| align=center| 1
| align=center| 0:39
| Atlantic City, New Jersey, United States
|
|-
| Win
| align=center| 16-10
| Jose Pacheco
| Submission (arm-triangle choke)
|  XFO 56: Outdoor War 11 
| 
| align=center| 3
| align=center| 4:10
| New Orleans, Louisiana, United States
| 
|-
| Win
| align=center| 15–10
| Mervin Rodriguez
| Decision (unanimous)
| Ring of Combat 51 
| 
| align=center| 1
| align=center| 4:27
| Bangor, Maine, United States
|
|-
| Win
| align=center| 14–10
|  Shelby Graham 
| Submission (rear-naked choke)
|Xtreme Fighting Organization 55
| 
| align=center| 1
| align=center| 2:38
| Chicago, Illinois, United States
| 
|-
| Win
| align=center| 13–10
| Kenny Foster
| KO (punches and elbows)
| Ring of Combat 50 
| 
| align=center| 1
| align=center| 1:55
|Atlantic City, New Jersey, United States
| 
|-
| Win
| align=center| 12–10
| Eric Calderon 
| Decision (unanimous)
| American Predator Fighting Championships 17
| 
| align=center| 1
| align=center| 1:55
| Illinois, United States
| 
|-
| Win
| align=center| 11–10
|  Gustavo Rodriguez 
| TKO (punches)
 |XFO 52: Outdoor War 10
| 
| align=center| 2
| align=center| 2:51
| Island Lake, Illinois, United States
| 
|-
| Loss
| align=center| 10–10
| Frankie Perez
| Submission (rear-naked choke)
| Ring of Combat 45
| 
| align=center| 21
| align=center| 1:56
| Louisville, Kentucky, United States
| 
|-
| Loss
| align=center| 10–9
| Mike Medrano
| Submission (guillotine choke)
|  CFFC 26: Sullivan vs. Martinez 
| 
| align=center| 1
| align=center|0:31
| Atlantic City, New Jersey, United States
| 
|-
| Loss
| align=center| 10–8
| Phillipe Nover
| Decision (Unanimous)
|Ring of Combat 45 
| 
| align=center| 3
| align=center| 5:00
| Fairfax, Virginia, United States
| 
|-
| Win
| align=center| 10–7
| Terry House Jr.
| Decision  (unanimous)
|Hoosier Fight Club 15
| 
| align=center| 2
| align=center| 2:54
|Valparaiso, Indiana, United States
|
|-
| Win
| align=center| 9–7
|  Dustin Phillips 
| Submission (rear-naked choke)
| MMA Xtreme Showdown
| 
| align=center| 3
| align=center| 5:00
| Illinois, United States
| 
|-
| Loss
| align=center| 8–7
| Deividas Taurosevicius
| Submission (guillotine choke)
| Ring of Combat 42
|
| align=center| 2
| align=center| 1:57
| Atlantic City, New Jersey, United States
| 
|-
| Win
| align=center| 8–6
| Omar Vega 
| TKO (punches)
| Maxx FC: Raise of Legends 2
| 
| align=center| 1
| align=center| 2:51
|San Juan, Puerto Rico
| 
|-
| Loss
| align=center| 7–6
| Taurean Bogguess
| Decision (unanimous)
| Xtreme Fighting Organization 43 
| 
| align=center| 3
| align=center| 5:00
| Anaheim, California, United States
| 
|-
| Win
| align=center| 7–5
| Patrick Murphy 
| TKO (Punches)
| Xtreme Gladiator Challenge: St. Patty's Day Beatdown
| 
| align=center| 1
| align=center| 2:14
| Cheyenne, Wyoming, United States
| 
|-
| Win
| align=center| 6–5
| Andrew Osborne
| TKO (Punches)
| Pure MMA: The Beginning
| 
| align=center| 1
| align=center| 3:38
| Plains, Pennsylvania, United States
| 
|-
| Loss
| align=center| 5–5
| Josh Shockley
| Submission (rear-naked choke)
| Chicago Cagefighting Championship 4 
| 
| align=center| 1
| align=center| 1:28
| Villa Park, Illinois, United States
| 
|-
| Loss
| align=center| 5–4
|  Brendan Weafer 
| TKO (punches)
| Cage Wars 8: House of Pain 
| 
| align=center| 1
| align=center| 1:16
| Atlantic City, New Jersey, United States
| 
|-
| Win
| align=center| 5–3
| Zach Underwood
| Decision (unanimous)
|  NAFC: Mayhem 
| 
| align=center| 3
| align=center| 5:00
| Milwaukee, Wisconsin, United States
| 
|-
| Loss
| align=center| 4–3
| Eric Kriegermeier
| Submission (rear-naked choke)
| Chicago Cagefighting Championship 
| 
| align=center| 2
| align=center| 3:
| Villa Park, Illinois, United States
| 
|-
| Win
| align=center| 4–2
|  Jeff Green 
| Submission (rear-naked xhoke)
| Hoosier FC 6: New Years Nemesis
| 
| align=center| 1
| align=center| 2:37
| Valparaiso, Indiana, United States
| 
|-
| Win
| align=center| 3–2
| Ramon Barber
| TKO (punches)
| Ruckus Entertainment 4
| 
| align=center| 1
| align=center| 4:01
| Addison, Illinois, United States
| 
|-
| Loss
| align=center| 2–1
|  Donavon Winters 
| TKO (punches)
| XFO 36
| 
| align=center| 2
| align=center|2:12
| Island Lake, Illinois, United States
| 
|-
| Win
| align=center| 2–0
| Jake Murphy
| Decision (split)
|Xtreme Fighting Organization 35 
| 
| align=center| 3
| align=center| 5:00
|Island Lake, Illinois, United States
|
|-
| Win
| align=center| 1–0
|  Brian van Hoven 
| Decision (unanimous)
|  Jake the Snake Promotions: Cage Time 1
| 
| align=center| 3
| align=center| 5:00
| Atlantic City, New Jersey, United States
|

See also 
 List of male mixed martial artists

References

External links 
  
 

1989 births
Living people
American male mixed martial artists
Featherweight mixed martial artists
Ultimate Fighting Championship male fighters